Sunny Varkey (born 9 April 1957) is a non-resident Indian, Dubai-based education entrepreneur and philanthropist. He is the founder and executive chairman of the global advisory and educational management firm GEMS Education, which is the largest operator of private kindergarten-to-grade-12 schools in the world, with a network of over 80 schools in over a dozen countries. He is also the chairman of the umbrella business organisation the Varkey Group, and the founder and trustee of the philanthropic Varkey Foundation. As of 2012, Varkey is also a UNESCO Goodwill Ambassador. And in June 2015, Varkey committed to The Giving Pledge, vowing to donate at least half of his money to philanthropic causes over his lifetime. He is the first education entrepreneur to join the pledge.

Early life and education
Varkey was born in Ranni, Kerala, India in 1957. His father, KS Varkey, and mother, Mariamma, were Kerala Syrian Christians, and educators. The family moved to Dubai in 1959, when the emirate was still very undeveloped. His father worked for British Bank of the Middle East, and both of his parents taught English to local Arabs, including members of the royal family. At the age of four, Sunny was sent back to Kerala to attend Infant Jesus Anglo-Indian Boys' School, a Catholic boarding school in Kollam city. When he was 11 years old, he sold fruit on the side of the road to make a little extra money. He and his elder sister returned to Dubai in 1970, and Sunny completed his O-Levels at St. Mary's Catholic High School. He pursued his A-Levels at Bembridge School in the UK for a year, and completed his A-Levels in Dubai at the British Council.

Career

GEMS education

History
The discovery of oil in Dubai in 1966 brought in many foreign workers, including many from the Indian subcontinent; with the increased demand for an English-language education for the children of Indian expatriates, Varkey's parents founded Our Own English High School in Dubai in 1968. Varkey returned to Dubai in 1977, and his employment included work at Standard Chartered bank, opening a small trading company and a maintenance company, becoming part owner of the Dubai Plaza Hotel, and entering the healthcare industry.

When in 1980 local authorities insisted that his parents' Our Own English High School be housed in a purpose-built facility, Varkey took over the operation of the school, which had under 400 students at the time. He soon dropped his other businesses, expanded the school, and added new schools as well. The education situation in Dubai was ripe for expansion, since local schools were only for native Arabs, and the children of the ever-increasing number of expats needed education of their own. Varkey opened Indian, Pakistani, and British schools, and offered education under the different curricula: Indian (CBSE and ICSE), U.S., British, and later International Baccalaureate.

After creating a strong network of schools in the Arab states of the Persian Gulf, in 2000 Varkey established Global Education Management Systems (GEMS), an advisory and educational management firm, in advance of his worldwide overseas expansion. In 2003, he began opening GEMS schools in England, beginning with Sherborne House in Hampshire and Bury Lawn in Milton Keynes. Soon afterwards, he took over Sherfield School in Hampshire, and purchased another 10 schools in England, mainly in the north.

In 2004, Varkey's GEMS group opened its first schools in India. Varkey continued to add schools in the subcontinent, and also purchased a controlling interest in the India-based Everonn Education, which the Varkey Group and GEMS manage. GEMS subsequently opened schools in Kenya, Uganda, Egypt, Jordan, Libya, Singapore, the U.S., Switzerland, and elsewhere around the globe. It is the largest operator of private kindergarten-to-grade-12 schools in the world.

Structure and philosophy
Varkey's GEMS schools are established in various price brackets, to serve all markets and income levels. The more expensive schools have more spacious grounds and amenities such as golf and tennis facilities, and smaller class sizes. Educational quality is maintained in the budget-range schools by using excellent teachers, by efficiency and economisation on time and space, and by capitalising on economies of scale: the huge network of GEMS schools shares resources and information and provides training to teachers across the whole system. When entering into new markets GEMS schools also benefit from local partners who understand local conditions; the partners provide local knowledge that may not be obvious through standard market research.

GEMS schools aim to offer a holistic education, and to instill students with values of altruism and philanthropy. GEMS Education is geared to form graduates who are forward-thinking global citizens with universal values and leadership qualities. For GEMS students, Varkey stresses an ideology and atmosphere of multiculturalism, and the importance of giving back to others both locally and globally.

GEMS Education Solutions
GEMS has two divisions: schools and educational services. GEMS Education Solutions is the consultancy arm of GEMS Education, providing educational services and advice, and it was established in 2011. It works with governments and non-profits, and public and private clients, to transform the quality of global education and skills provision, using the resources of GEMS' more than 50 years of experience in the field.

One of GEMS Education Solutions' projects is assisting and advising the state school system in the United Arab Emirates. In Ghana, it implements MGCubed – Making Ghana Girls Great – which equips two classrooms in each Ghanaian primary school with a computer, projector, satellite modem, and solar panels, creating an interactive distance-learning platform to deliver both formal in-school teaching and informal after-school training. The project teaches 8,000 students in 72 Ghanaian schools, and is Sub-Saharan Africa's first interactive distance-learning project.

In Saudi Arabia, via the Oxford Partnership, GEMS Education Solutions co-manages three newly built women's vocational colleges. The three-year diploma programmes include training in IT, communication, basic sciences, and English language, before moving onto specialisation and on-the-job training.

Varkey Foundation
Varkey developed a habit of philanthropy from the example of his father and from his own strong spiritual values. In December 2010, he consolidated and structured his various donations and charitable initiatives by creating the Varkey Foundation (initially the Varkey GEMS Foundation) as the philanthropic arm of GEMS. The foundation intends to impact 100 impoverished children for every child enrolled at GEMS schools, via enrolment and education-access initiatives, worldwide teacher training programs, advocacy campaigns, and physical projects such as building classrooms, schools, and learning centres. Bill Clinton launched the foundation.

In March 2011, the foundation partnered with UNESCO for girls' education in Lesotho and Kenya, and donated $1,000,000 to the effort. In September 2011, a further $1 million was pledged with UNESCO to train 10,000 school principals in India, Ghana, and Kenya. In 2014, the foundation's Teacher Training Programme committed to train 250,000 teachers within 10 years in under-served communities across the world.

In 2013, the Varkey Foundation helped launch the annual Global Education and Skills Forum, in partnership with UNESCO and the U.A.E. Ministry of Education. Bill Clinton gave the inaugural keynote address. Varkey hopes the annual forum will become the "Davos of education". At the second annual forum in March 2014, Varkey announced the Global Teacher Prize, a $1 million award to an exceptional teacher who has made an outstanding contribution to the profession, to be presented at the third annual GESF in 2015.

Varkey Group
Varkey Group is the umbrella organisation covering GEMS Education and Varkey's other businesses, including healthcare and, previously, construction. Varkey founded the company in 1979, and it is based in Dubai, with additional offices in the UK, U.S., and India.

In 1984 Varkey founded Welcare, a healthcare consultancy and management venture which developed a number of hospitals and clinics. A controlling interest in Emirates Healthcare, the Varkey Group's umbrella company which held Welcare, was purchased by Mediclinic International in 2012. The sale of his healthcare sector allowed Varkey to focus on education and educational philanthropy.

Honors
Global Indian Business Award (2007)
CEO Middle East Award – Corporate Social Responsibility (2007)
Outstanding Asian Businessman of the Year (2007)
Rajiv Gandhi Award for Eminent Educationist (2008)
Padma Shri Award (2009)
Honorary Order – Public Recognition award from the Government of Russia (2011)
Middle East Excellence CEO of the Year – Knowledge Development and Education Partnership (2012)
UNESCO Goodwill Ambassador (2012)
Education Business Leader of the Year, Gulf Business Industry Awards (2012)
Honorary Doctorate, Heriot-Watt University (2012)
Entrepreneur of the Year, The Asian Awards (2018)

Personal life
Varkey lives in Dubai. He is married and has two sons, Dino and Jay, who have taken leadership roles in GEMS Education, allowing him to focus on his philanthropic foundation. Varkey's sister, Susan Mathews, runs pre-schools, and his wife and mother have both offered advice on the GEMS family business.

References

External links
Official site
Sunny Varkey – Profile at Bloomberg Businessweek

Businesspeople from Kerala
Businesspeople of Indian descent
Indian chairpersons of corporations
Indian emigrants to the United Arab Emirates
Founders of educational institutions
Indian philanthropists
GEMS schools
1957 births
Living people
Recipients of the Padma Shri in literature & education
Kerala diaspora
Giving Pledgers
21st-century philanthropists
UNESCO Goodwill Ambassadors